Steina Vasulka (born Steinunn Briem Bjarnadottir in 1940) and Woody Vasulka (born Bohuslav Vašulka on 20 January 1937 – 20 December 2019) are early pioneers of video art, and have been producing work since the early 1960s. The couple met in the early 1960s and moved to New York City in 1965, where they began showing video art at the Whitney Museum and founded The Kitchen in 1971. Steina and Woody both became Guggenheim fellows: Steina in 1976, and Woody in 1979.

Early life and education
Steina Vasulka was born in Reykjavík, Iceland and trained as a classical musician and violinist and was a member of the Iceland Symphony Orchestra. Steina received a scholarship at the Prague Conservatory in 1959. 

Woody Vasulka was born in Brno, now in the Czech Republic and trained as an engineer before studying television and film production at the Academy of Performing Arts in Prague. While pursuing his studies in the fifties, Woody Vasulka wrote poetry and produced short films. The pair met in Prague in the early 1960s, where Woody introduced video to Steina.

New York / The Kitchen
For the first few years following their relocation to in New York, the Vasulkas were not involved with the local art scene; Steina continued to practice as a violinist and Woody began making independent documentaries and edited industrial films at Harvey Lloyd Productions. In 1967, at the request of architects Woods and Ramirez, Woody collaborated on developing films designed for a multi-screen environment to be shown in the American Pavilion at Expo 67 in Montreal. In 1968, Woody conducted his first experiments with images made with electronics and put aside the cinematographic form in favor of video. Steina was experimenting with video at the same time as Woody, with equipment that the couple had borrowed from Lloyd. Over time, the Vasulkas became more closely involved with the artistic communities around them and the emerging fascination with video and new-media, and grew more dedicated to their developing video art practice until they made it their shared full-time occupation.

On December 31, 1969 and January 1, 1970 Woody Valsulka video recorded Jimi Hendrix performing with Band of Gypsys at the Fillmore East in NYC. The recordings are included on a DVD included in a CD release of the concerts. (Source: Live at the Fillmore DVD released 1999, released again 2012)

In 1971, the Vasulkas founded The Kitchen, a multi-use media theater located in the kitchen of the Mercer Arts Center in Grand Central Hotel, Greenwich Village, in the interest of cultivating new-media art in an inclusive, comprehensive, and un-administrative context. Under the direction of Dimitri Devyatkin, and with help from Andy Mannik, Sia and Michael Tschudin, Rhys Chatham, and Shridhar Bapat, the space received a grant from the New York State Council on the Arts and expanded its programming, which was foregrounded by video and electronic media performance and would come to include new music programming under the direction of Rhys Chatham. The Kitchen would relocate following the collapse of the Mercer Arts Centre, but maintain its mission.

The Kitchen was valuable space for a number of music, performance, and media artists in New York who at the time did not feel welcome in commercial galleries or the mainstream art-world. The Vasulkas' programming for The Kitchen provided the space to a number video artists who would become prominent, including Joan Jonas, Nancy Holt, Vito Acconci, Mary Lucier, Dara Birnbaum, Bill Viola, and Gary Hill.

Work

The work that the Vasulkas presented at The Kitchen's original Greenwich Village location, which amounted to a handful of performances and showings each month, included a range of live documentary and experimental videos, live video performances, live video processing, media installations, and “experiments in perception.”

The Vasulkas' work at this time was colored by the artists' interest in negotiating terms like "space" in the context of video and what Yvonne Spielman calls video's "image object." The Vasulkas' wide exploration of video in this ontological regard led to apparent contrast, such as that between the documentary-style Participation series involving footage of real-life performances (occurring in the space in front of and around the video camera), and works like Caligrams, in which the Vasulkas use hardware devices such as scan processors, video sequencers, and multikeyers to "play" or perform with video like a musical instrument, and in a different kind of space.

In 1974, The Vasulkas moved to Buffalo, New York to pursue a faculty position at the State University of New York's Department of Media Studies, though they would maintain involvement with The Kitchen and its programming. Though Steina and Woody had worked outside their duo before, their practices diverged to a greater extent following this relocation. Woody's practice became more focused on digital image manipulation and the employment of tools like the Rutt/Etra Video Synthesizer (Bill Etra, a co-creator of this device, showed frequently at the Kitchen during the Vasulkas' tenure). Steina's practice centered around environmental, mechanical, and physical relationships between body, video, and camera, beginning with a late-1970s series of moving-camera environments titled All Vision and Machine Vision which were shown, in part, at The Kitchen.

The Vasulkas have collaborated with Harald Bode (posthumously).

The Vasulka Chamber
In 2014, The National Gallery of Iceland opened the Vasulka Chamber, a collaboration between the museum and the artist couple. They donated a substantial amount of their digital archive to the museum and it is the Chamber's aim to preserve the legacy and collection of the artists.

The Vasulka Archive
In 2016 the Vašulka Kitchen Brno (VKB) was established in Brno in The Czech Republic, for research, artistic experiment and informal education in the field of new media art. It consists of the archive of Woody and Steina Vašulkas’ work and a permanent exhibition of their selected works.

Gallery representation
The Vasulkas are represented by commercial art gallery BERG Contemporary.

Selected works
Complete and existing videotapes by Steina and Woody Vasulka include:

1969–71

 Participation, 60 min., b/w
1970
Adagio, 10 min., color
 Calligrams, 12 min., b/w
 Decay #1, 7 min., color
 Decay #2, 7 min., b/w
 Don Cherry, 12 min., b/w (in collaboration with Elaine Milosh) 
 Evolution, 16 min 
 Interface, 3:30 min., b/w 
 Jackie Curtis' First Television Special, 45 min., b/w
 Sexmachine, 6 min., b/w 
 Sketches, 27 min., b/w
 Tissues, 6min., b/w
1970-78
 Violin Power, video, 10:04 min., b/w, sound (by Steina Vasulka) 
1971
 Black Sunrise, 21 min., color
 Contrapoint, 3 min., b/w
 Discs, 6 min., b/w
 Elements, 9 min., color
 Keysnow, 12 min., color
 Shapes, 13 min., b/w
 Swan Lake, 7 min., b/w 
1972
 Distant Activities, 6 min., color
 Soundprints, endless loops, color
 Spaces 1, 15 min., b/w
 Spaces 2, 15 min., b/w
1973
 Golden Voyage,  28 min., color
 Home, 16 min., color
 Vocabulary, 5 min., color
1974
 1-2-3-4, 8 min., color
 Heraldic View, 5 min., color
 Noisefields, 13 min., color
 Solo For 3, 5 min., color
 Soundgated Images, 10 min., color 
 Soundsize, 5 min., color 
 Telc, 5 min., color
1979
 Six Programs for Television: Matrix, Vocabulary, Transformations, Object, Steina, Digital Images, 174 min., total (29 min. each), color
1981
 In Search of the Castle, 12 min., color
 Progeny, 19 min., color (in collaboration with Bradford Smith)
1983
 The West, color
1984
 Pariah, color
1989
 In the Land of the Elevator Girls, color

References

External links

 Vasulkas' web-presence
Steina and Woody Vasulka in the Video Data Bank
 Steina and Woody Vasulka, Mediateca Media Art Space
 Video Out, documentary about VJing's roots in video out and influence of Vasulkas. Features interview with Steina Vasulka.
 Steina and Woody Vasulka portfolio at Imai
 Tools Thomas Dreher: History of Computer Art Chap. IV.1.2 Video Synthesizers.www.listasafn.is 
 Switch! Monitor! Drift! (3:45) (1976) on UbuWeb
 The Kitchen: Steina and Woody Vasulka

Academy of Performing Arts in Prague alumni
Performance art in New York City
American video artists
American people of Czech descent
American people of Icelandic descent
20th-century women artists
Digital artists
Artists from New Mexico